Uri Weinberg (24 March 1937 – 6 March 2012) was an Israeli footballer. He played in two matches for the Israel national football team from 1961 to 1962.

References

External links
 

1937 births
2012 deaths
Israeli footballers
Israel international footballers
Place of birth missing
Association footballers not categorized by position